is a Japanese wheelchair basketball-themed manga series written and illustrated by Takehiko Inoue. It has been serialized in Shueisha's seinen manga magazine Weekly Young Jump since October 1999, with the chapters collected into 15 tankōbon volumes as of November 2020. After a long hiatus that started in 2014, the series has returned in 2019 with a quarterly release schedule.

In North America, the series is licensed for English language release by Viz Media.

As of November 2020, the manga had over 16 million copies in circulation. In 2001, Real won an Excellence Award at the 5th Japan Media Arts Festival.

Plot
The story revolves around three teenagers: Nomiya Tomomi, a high school dropout, Togawa Kiyoharu, an ex-sprinter who now plays wheelchair basketball and Takahashi Hisanobu, a popular leader of the high school's basketball team who now finds himself a paraplegic after an accident.

Real features a cast of characters who find themselves being marginalized by society, but are all united by one common feature: a desire to play basketball, with no place to play it in. Nomiya, being a high school dropout, has no future in his life. Togawa, being a difficult personality, finds himself constantly feuding with his own teammates. Takahashi, once a popular team leader, now finds himself being unable to move from the chest down. Real also deals with the reality of physical disabilities, and the psychological inferiority that the characters struggle against. The characters break through their own psychological barriers bit by bit.

Characters

Forced to spend all of his free time after school practicing the piano, Togawa was something of an outcast to the rest of his junior high classmates. During the last PE class of the first semester, Togawa agrees to race the 100M dash against the fastest boy in his class and nearly beats him, earning an invitation to the school's track team. Togawa soon dedicates his life to becoming the fastest sprinter in the nation, but just as his goal seems in reach, he is diagnosed with osteosarcoma and loses his right leg below the knee. Togawa spends much of his time after the amputation in isolation, feeling his life is over until meeting Tora, an older man with an identical disability, a rotationplasty. Tora, a cool jet-setting tattoo artist, serves as a mentor to Togawa and introduces him to the world of wheelchair basketball through his team the Tigers. Togawa is a fiercely competitive player, and once left the team because he felt the other players were not as serious as he was. Missing the game, Togawa returns to the Tigers, yet provokes a team mutiny early in the series because of his often "unrealistic expectations." Further conflicts arise when Togawa is offered a spot on the Japanese national team and is invited to join the Dream, the Tigers' arch-rivals.
When they first meet, Nomiya Tomomi is so impressed with Togawa's skills that he compares Togawa to NBA star Vince Carter, and often refers to Togawa as "Vince."

On the surface, Nomiya seems to be the proto-typical delinquent—he wears an afro, has dropped out of high school, and pauses to defecate on the school steps before leaving for good. It soon becomes clear, however, that Nomiya suffers from crushing guilt over a traffic accident he caused which cost a girl (Yamashita Yasumi) the use of her legs. While only an average student, Nomiya was obsessed with basketball, and not being able to play on the school team has left him directionless and without joy. While taking the paraplegic and seemingly catatonic Yasumi for a walk, Nomiya overhears the sounds of Togawa playing basketball. Starved for playing time, Nomiya challenges Togawa to a game and comes away impressed by Togawa's skill and determination. Soon, Nomiya becomes something of a cheerleader/mascot for the Tigers and a friend to Togawa. Even though he rarely gets a chance to actually play basketball, it seems to be enough for Nomiya to be around others that do. Nomiya later in the series tries to join professional basketball team, he leaves strong impression but in the end he is not chosen. Sometime after that, he gains weight and slowly starts to lose his will. He is left wondering if this is the end of his basketball career.
Nomiya spends much of his time wondering where he went wrong, and trying to fix his life—inspired by the Tigers' spirit, he shaves his head and goes on something of a monk-like quest to change his fate. Against all odds, his desire to change and positive attitude seem to be rubbing off on his co-workers and acquaintances.

At the beginning, Takahashi is a typical high school alpha male-- captain of the basketball team, popular with girls, effortlessly smart, and a bully to other "inferior" students. In an effort to give his girlfriend a ride home after school, he steals a bicycle, is chased into traffic, and is hit by a garbage truck, rendering him paralyzed from the chest down. Realizing that his popular days are over, Takahashi feels that he has nothing to live for, and that he has dropped from an "A" class person to lower than an "E" class (Takahashi is obsessed with ranking the people around him - in ranks from A to E, with A being the best). Nomiya, a former teammate, is one of the few visitors Takahashi receives, and the visit is initially enough to upset Takahashi and inspire him to rehabilitate. After realizing he will never recover, however, Takahashi gives up and refuses to help himself, even going so far as to tell his mother to die and never come back. The hospital staff calls Takahashi's father, hoping that a visit to the country will help in his recovery, but Takahashi has not seen his father in eight years and the visit remains highly uncomfortable. After spending time with his father, Takahashi breaks down and admits that he has a lot of unexplored anger and resentment towards his father for abandoning the family. He later attempts to join the Dreams after watching Shiratori's wrestling match.

Fumika is one of the few people who visit Takahashi in the hospital after his accident (perhaps because she feels somewhat responsible for what happened). Takahashi does not think very highly of her (ranking her a "C" at best), but is somewhat surprised to find that she still considers them a couple despite his condition. She tells Takahashi how her dog, Angelina, will also have to use a wheelchair-like device, and that just because someone is "damaged" does not mean their life is over.

A childhood friend and possible love interest of Togawa, Azumi helps out as the manager for the Tigers. Azumi and Nomiya also meet at driving school, where Azumi reveals she is working hard to get her license so that she can drive Togawa to games and practices. Yama later embarrasses both Azumi and Togawa by saying they make a nice couple, and asking if they were engaged—further increasing the awkwardness between the two. Nomiya appears to have a crush on her, while Togawa chooses to not express his romantic feelings for her.

Yama suffers from what appears to be Duchenne muscular dystrophy (though the actual condition is never specified within the story), forcing him to leave the team. According to his diagnosis, Yama will most likely not live beyond 20. Togawa meets Yama almost two years after Togawa loses his leg, and finds inspiration in Yama's positive attitude and "carpe diem" philosophy. As the disease progresses, Togawa is distressed to find that the once positive Yama is now negative and bitter. In order to help his friend, Togawa lets him know just how much he appreciates Yama, referring to him as a "hero."

A huge 190 cm tall wheelchair basketball player who originally schools Nomiya and Togawa when they try to hustle money on the basketball court. Since Togawa has never lost a game to another wheelchair basketball player before, he is inspired to rejoin the Tigers in order to get revenge on Nagano. Though Japanese, Nagano attends New South Wales University in Australia and calls everyone "mate." Impressed by Togawa's skills, Nagano eventually joins the post-mutiny Tigers.

Takahashi's father. During Takahashi's childhood, he was a typical salaryman who worked long hours and drove an expensive car. He also introduced his son to the world of basketball, hand-crafting a backboard and teaching him several techniques. Takahashi lived for playing basketball with his father, and was devastated when he abandoned the family 8 years before the story. Fed up with the salary man lifestyle, Takahashi's father moved to the country and is currently living a much simpler life making and selling pottery. After Takahashi's accident, his father has become responsible for his son's care, refusing to give in to Takahashi's outbursts and cynicism.
Togawa's father
After his wife's death, Togawa's father (an unathletic, failed pianist) puts all of his efforts into turning his son into a famous piano player. While upset that Togawa quits the piano to join the track team, Togawa's father eventually comes around to support his son's efforts. After his son's operation, Togawa's father inadvertently helps isolate his son.

Publication
Real, written and illustrated by Takehiko Inoue, has been serialized in Shueisha's seinen manga magazine Weekly Young Jump since October 1999. The individual chapters have been collected by Shueisha into individual tankōbon volumes, with the first volume being published on March 19, 2001. After a long hiatus started in 2014, Inoue announced in 2019 that he would resume the manga on May 23 of the same year. The next chapter of the manga was published on August 29. A new chapter was published in February 2020. As of November 19, 2020, 15 volumes have been published.

In North America, the series is licensed for English language release by Viz Media, who announced the acquisition in November 2007. The first volume was released on July 15, 2008.

Volume list

Reception
As of November 2013, Real had 14 million copies in circulation. As of November 2020, the manga had over 16 million copies in circulation.

Real won an Excellence Award in the Manga Division at the 5th Japan Media Arts Festival in 2001. Citing the reason for the award: "Takehiko Inoue is well-known for Slam Dunk a serial comic on the subject of basketball. Real is another sports comic, but one whose story revolves around the novel theme of tough guys and wheelchair basketball. All of the Adjudication Committee members could hardly wait to read the next installments and had to content themselves with awarding Real the Excellence Prize. It would have been no surprise if Inoue had followed his success with Vagabond by winning the Grand Prize for the second year in a row with this terrific manga".

A review at The Comics Reporter noted that "all of the skills that Inoue displayed in Slam Dunk have evolved for the better in Real", going on to conclude that "the emotional content is presented with a poise and certainty that's really nothing short of breathtaking." The series has been praised for its "realism", and how it "breaks away from conventional portrayals of the disabled as innocent people who are weak in every way." Kazuyuki Kyoya, a wheelchair basketball player, has also expressed his approval of the series: "The manga calls for understanding of people not only in wheelchair basketball but also with various other disabilities. I’m impressed that the scenes in which Takahashi undergoes rehab are elaborately expressed." About.com's Deb Aoki lists Real as the best new manga of 2008.

References

External links
 
Inoue Takehiko on the web

1999 manga
Basketball in anime and manga
Seinen manga
Shueisha manga
Takehiko Inoue
Viz Media manga
Wheelchair basketball